Archangela Girlani, born as Eleanora Girlani, (1460 – 25 January 1494) was an Italian Carmelite nun who was known for her visions. Pope Pius IX beatified her on 1 October 1864.

Life
Eleanora Girlani was born in 1460 to a noble family of Trino in the Duchy of Savoy. Having been educated by the Benedictines, she had planned to become a Benedictine. However, on her way to the abbey, her horse refused to take her there. Interpreting this a sign, she instead became a Carmelite nun in Parma, and was given the religious name of Archangela. She made her first vows in 1478. Later she was elected the prioress of her monastery, and went on to found a new Carmelite convent in Mantua. 

Girlani is remembered as a mystic who had a special devotion to the Most Holy Trinity, and was reported to have the gifts of ecstasies, and miracles, including levitation.

Widespread devotion and reports of healing arose after her death in 1494. Her feast day is celebrated on 13 February.

References

1460 births
1494 deaths
15th-century Christian mystics
People from the Province of Vercelli
15th-century Italian Roman Catholic religious sisters and nuns
Venerated Carmelites
Carmelite mystics
Italian beatified people
Carmelite beatified people
15th-century venerated Christians